Tolerantia (2008) is a 6 minute short animated film. It is the first 3D animated short film produced in Bosnia and Herzegovina. It was directed and produced by Ivan Ramadan independently. The film is about intolerance between people.

The film has been awarded with "Heart of Sarajevo" award for the best short film at 14th Sarajevo Film Festival. It has won the Prix UIP award which automatically nominated the film for 2008 European Film Academy Awards. The film has been screened as part of official selection of about 30 festivals around the world.

Plot 

The hero of the story awakes after a long sleep, at the end of the last ice age. His reasoning is not something you should be envious of, but he is capable of starting something big….

Production 

Tolerantia was produced through the period of 2 and a half months, but the idea, characters, and scenario had been created and refined one year before the completion date of February 2008. The film has been entirely created by Ivan Ramadan, including: producing, directing, script, editing, animation, sound and post production. Film transfer to 35mm was supported and made possible by Federal Ministry of Culture and Sports of Bosnia and Herzegovina. The first screening of the film was at Meeting Point cinema in Sarajevo on 6 May 2008.

Awards 

Tolerantia has been awarded 7 times so far of which most notable is the nomination for the best short film at the European Film Academy 2008.
The full list of awards (chronologically):
2008:
Special Mention – 36th Huesca Film Festival, Spain
Prix UIP - 14th Sarajevo Film Festival (and nomination for the best short film at European Film Academy), Bosnia and Herzegovina
Heart of Sarajevo for the Best Short Film – 14th Sarajevo Film Festival, Bosnia and Herzegovina
Special award for Creativity and Artistic Expression – 1st Animated Film Festival Banjaluka, Bosnia and Herzegovina
Special Jury Citation – Extraordinary Achievement – 10th 24fps International Film Festival, Texas, USA
2009:
The Best 3D Animated Film - 4th Neum Animation Film Festival, Bosnia and Herzegovina
Special Jury Mention for Animation Film - 7th ISFF In the Palace, Bulgaria

References

External links 
 
 Tolerantia at Culture Unplugged
 Tolerantia on Vimeo
 Tolerantia on YouTube

2008 films
Bosnia and Herzegovina short films
Bosnia and Herzegovina animated films
2000s animated short films